Odites exterrita is a moth in the family Depressariidae. It was described by Edward Meyrick in 1937. It is found in South Africa.

The wingspan is about 17 mm. The forewings are cream white, with the costal edge tinged yellow. The hindwings are grey, with the apical edge somewhat suffused pale yellowish.

References

Endemic moths of South Africa
Moths described in 1937
Odites
Taxa named by Edward Meyrick